Drag Dragfi de Beltek was Count of the Székelys from 1387 until 1390. He was a member of the House of Dragoș and  a descendant of Dragoș, Voivode of Moldavia.

Sources
Joódy Pál - Cercetarea calitắții de nobil in comitatul Maramures. Anii 1749-1769, Editura societắții culturale Pro Maramures "Dragos Vodắ", Cluj-Napoca, 2003
Joan cavaler de Puscariu - Date istorice privitoare la familiile nobile romắne. Editura societắții culturale Pro Maramures "Dragos Vodắ", Cluj-Napoca, 2003
Prof. Alexandru Filipascu de Dolha si Petrova - Istoria Maramuresului, Editura "Gutinul" Baia Mare, 1997.
Wyrostek, Ludwik - Rod Dragow-Sasow na Wegrzech i Rusi Halickiej. RTH t. XI/1931-1932

References

|-
! colspan="3" style="background: #ACE777; color: #000000" | Hungarian nobility

Counts of the Székelys
House of Dragoș